Gio Giaan Aplon (born 6 October 1982) is a South African rugby union player for Toyota Verblitz in the Top League in Japan. He scored two tries in a 42–17 triumph against the Six Nations winner – France.  The match was also his debut playing as a South African winger number 14.

Career
Aplon is a winger who played for the Stormers. He also has had a very successful South African sevens career. He has blistering speed and is known as the "pocket dynamo". Playing with the Stormers gave him confidence. Even though he is small in stature, his speed and elusiveness causes the opposition much grief. He is known for his side steps and is a versatile backline player. Known affectionately by the nickname "Appels" (Afrikaans for Apples) by fans due to his surname, he has become a firm favourite amongst Bok supporters. During the Test in Cape Town against the French on 12 June 2010 he scored 2 tries and was named Man of the Match.

Aplon was part of the winning Western Province Currie Cup side in 2012.

On 13 May 2020, Aplon was announced as Jake White's first signing as the Blue Bulls coach.

Grenoble
Aplon signed a deal to join French side Grenoble after the 2014 Super Rugby season.

Childhood
Aplon was born in Hawston, a small town to the east of Cape Town. Before he started playing rugby, he was in the cricket side for his school.

References

External links
 
 WP rugby profile
 Stormers profile

1982 births
Living people
People from Overstrand Local Municipality
Cape Coloureds
South African rugby union players
Stormers players
Western Province (rugby union) players
Rugby union fullbacks
Rugby union wings
South Africa international rugby union players
South Africa international rugby sevens players
South African expatriate rugby union players
South African expatriate sportspeople in France
Expatriate rugby union players in France
FC Grenoble players
Rugby sevens players at the 2006 Commonwealth Games
Commonwealth Games rugby sevens players of South Africa
Toyota Verblitz players
Bulls (rugby union) players
Blue Bulls players
Rugby union players from the Western Cape